The Marathon de La Rochelle is an annual road running event which takes place in late November in La Rochelle, France. It features a full 42.195 km marathon race as well a 10 km race for amateur runners, a half marathon for wheelchair athletes, and a recreational 4 km jog around the city's harbour.

The city of La Rochelle had its first marathon race in 1981. This competition, which featured winners such as Driss Dacha in 1989, lasted until 1989 (with shorter 20 km races occurring in 1983 to 1985). Following the absence of a race in 1990, the Marathon de La Rochelle was established in its place, having its first edition on 24 November, 1991. The marathon is one of the most popular in France, having had a record high of 10,000 entrants and 8625 finishers at the 20th edition in 2010. Among French races, only the Paris Marathon has had greater participation.

Following the sudden death of Serge Vigot, the race founder and president of the organising committee, during the 2005 Marrakech Marathon, the event was officially renamed the Marathon De La Rochelle - Serge Vigot in his honour. 

The race held IAAF Bronze Label Road Race status in 2011.

The course of the race is based on the streets of the central and historical port areas of the city. It has a double-looped figure-8 format and a flat race profile, which makes it easier for elite runners to record fast times. The runners in the marathon are predominantly French, but the elite level races attract East African and other European athletes. The total annual prize money available is typically around 37,000€.

The current men's and women's course records are held by Kenya's John Kipkorir Komen (2:07:13 hours) and Goitetom Haftu Tesema of Ethiopia (2:28:24 hours), respectively. The most successful athletes historically at the race are John Ngeny (who won three times straight from 2000 to 2002) and Elizabeth Chemweno (who won three times between 2005 and 2008).

Past winners
Key:

Wins by country

References

List of winners
Festou, Michel et al. (2011-11-27). La Rochelle Marathon. Association of Road Racing Statisticians. Retrieved on 2011-11-27.

External links
Official website

Marathons in France
Recurring sporting events established in 1991
Tourist attractions in La Rochelle
Sport in La Rochelle
Tourist attractions in Charente-Maritime